The Octopod Circular External Fixator is medical device developed to treat bone fractures and deformities.  The device consists of 4 main vertical struts between 2 rings and 4 assistant diagonal struts.  This 3rd Generation Circular External Fixator thus contains 8 combined mobile struts from which it derives its octopod name. With the octopod method the device can reach a wider correction range, thereby solving a major problem of the 2nd Generation Circular External Fixators, that of having to frequently change struts. The previous difficulties in taking manual measurements when using both 1st and the 2nd Generation External Fixators are resolved by using the 3rd Generation Circular External Fixator.

Dr. Gavril A. Ilizarov developed a groundbreaking surgical technique on distraction osteogenesis in the 1950s.  His technique served as the foundation for his invention, the 1st Generation Circular External Fixator. His method and the apparatus he invented are the oldest and most common method of distraction osteogenesis.

The first 2nd Generation Circular External Fixator, an Hexapod External Fixator Frame, was developed in the 1990s.  Even though the 2nd Generation External Fixator represented an improvement over the 1st Generation, it was very cumbersome to use manually.  Computer applications were developed to facilitate its use; however, its applications were still limited.  Calculations with the hexapod method are many times inaccurate, leading to complications when controlling the bone deformity correction.   In addition, the dependence of the patient on the hospital is increased in cases of severe deformities, which require strut exchange when using the hexapod method. Since the treatment cannot be finished in one session and requires frequent check-up, the patient suffers additionally from more X-ray examinations.  The 2nd Generation Computer Assisted Eternal Fixator also required extensive training and experience on the part of the physicians. These limitations prevented 2nd Generation Fixators from completely supplanting the original Ilizarov design.

The Adam Frame External Fixator was developed as a 3rd Generation Octopod Circular External Fixator with new software technology and a unique design in 2009. Adam Frame uses the octopod method in its new models in conjunction with Ilizarov’s principles.  X-ray film can be uploaded to the web-based program in where the measurements are performed automatically by the Jonah Bone Navigation Software.   The I-Tech Bone Correction Software then performs the necessary calculations for bone correction.

Adam Frame has pioneered the new generation of Circular External Fixators while remaining faithful to Ilizarov’s principles. The new line of fixators uses advanced software to solve the previous problems of measurement accuracy and the need for specialized training. If desired, surgeons can also use the fixator without the software, as with the previous generations of fixators. Adam Frame provides a complete product and system which integrates all the advantages of the previous models into a new design.

See also
 Distraction osteogenesis
 Bone fracture
 Trauma surgery
 Traumatology
 External fixation
 Taylor Spatial Frame

References

External links
 imedsurgical.com
 Adam Frame
 Limb Lengthening
 Paley Advanced Limb Lengthening Institute

Medical equipment